David Franks (born 1979) is a retired Irish hurler who played as a centre-back for the Offaly senior team until November 2012.

Franks made his first appearance for the team during the 2000 championship and was a regular member of the starting fifteen until his retirement after the 2012 championship.  During that time he won two National League (Division 2) medals. Franks was an All-Ireland runner-up on one occasion.

Although he has retired from the Offaly County team, he still plays at club level. Franks plays with Carrickshock in Kilkenny. He began his career with Ballyskenagh.

References

1979 births
Living people
Ballyskenagh hurlers
Carrickshock hurlers
Offaly inter-county hurlers